Atheism is, in a broad sense, the lack of belief in the existence of deities. In a narrower sense, atheism is simply the absence of belief that any deities exist. This is a compilation of the various lists of atheists with articles on Wikipedia by category. Living people in these lists are those whose atheism is relevant to their notable activities or public life, and who have publicly identified themselves as atheists.

Lists by country, territory, or people
List of atheist Americans
List of atheist Armenians
List of Dutch atheists
List of Jewish atheists and agnostics
List of South African atheists

Lists by profession
 List of atheist activists and educators
 List of atheist authors
 List of atheist philosophers
 List of atheists in film, radio, television and theater
 List of atheists in music
 List of atheists in politics and law
 List of atheists in science and technology
 List of atheists (miscellaneous)

Lists by surname 
 List of atheists (surnames A to B)
 List of atheists (surnames C to D)
 List of atheists (surnames E to G)
 List of atheists (surnames H to K)
 List of atheists (surnames L to M)
 List of atheists (surnames N to Q)
 List of atheists (surnames R to S)
 List of atheists (surnames T to Z)

See also 

 
 List of nonreligious Nobel laureates
 List of fictitious atheists and agnostics
 Lists of people by belief (including non-beliefs)
 List of agnostics
 List of converts to nontheism
 List of deists
 List of former atheists and agnostics
 List of humanists
 List of Jewish atheists and agnostics
 List of pantheists

 List of secularist organizations
 Lists about skepticism 

Lists of religious skeptics